The PLA Army Service Academy, formerly known as the Logistical Engineering University of PLA or University of Logistics, is an institution of higher learning in Chongqing, focusing on military engineering. It is affiliated to the General Logistics Department of the People's Liberation Army of China and is one of the leading military engineering academies in the country.

It was founded in 1961 and was named a national key university in 1979.

Facilities
University of Logistics, established in 1961, is at Majiabao and Xietaizi in the city of Chongqing. It covers over 1300 acres, with building area over 400 thousand square meters.

There are over 650,000 books in the library, and it has area network and E-reading rooms. It has a member of the Chinese Academy of Engineering.

It has 248 professors and associate professors, 13 PHD supervisors, and 91 postgraduate supervisors, 49 of which are benefited from the government’s special allowance.

Disciplines and courses

 Architecture
 Structural Engineering
 Underground Engineering
 Plumbing and Heating and Ventilation Engineering
 Power System and Automation
 Oil Storage and Transportation Automation
 Command Automation Engineering
 Oil Storage and Transportation Engineering
 Oil Chemistry
 Warehouse Automation
 Barracks Management
 Military Warehouse Management
 Barracks Device Management
 Oil Machinery and Equipment and Automation
 Fuel Management
 Fuel Quality Measurement Management
 Environmental Engineering

Post-doctoral research center

 Chemical Engineering and Technology

Doctorate authorization
Geotechnical Engineering
Applied Chemistry
Petroleum and Natural Gas Storage and Transportation

Master's authorization

State-level key discipline

 Petroleum and Natural Gas Storage and Transportation

Provincial and municipal key discipline

Petroleum and Natural Gas Storage and Transportation
Applied Chemistry
Logistics
 Management Science and Engineering

Military key laboratory

 Military underground construction lab

Provincial key laboratory

Experimental Center of Petroleum and Natural Gas Storage and Transportation
Oil testing and assessment center

External links
 Logistical Engineering University website

Educational institutions established in 1961
Universities and colleges in Chongqing
Military education and training in China
1961 establishments in China